The 1896 Highland Views football team was an American football team that represented the Highland Views club of South Bend, Indiana in the 1896 college football season. The Green and White (the club's colors) had held claim to being the Northern Indiana and Southern Michigan football champions, as they had not lost or been scored against in the past three years.  This claim was dashed when the club team lost to Notre Dame, 82 to 0.

Schedule

References

Highland Views Athletic Club
Highland Views Athletic Club football seasons
HHighland Views Athletic Club football